In Japanese writing, the kana え (hiragana) and エ (katakana) (romanised e) occupy the fourth place, between う and お, in the modern Gojūon (五十音) system of collating kana. In the Iroha, they occupy the 34th, between こ and て. In the table at right (ordered by columns, from right to left), え lies in the first column (あ行, "column A") and the fourth row (え段, "row E").  Both represent .

Derivation
え and エ originate, via man'yōgana, from the kanji 衣 and 江, respectively.

The archaic kana ゑ (we), as well as many non-initial occurrences of the character へ (he), have entered the modern Japanese language as え. The directional particle へ is today pronounced "e", though not written as え. Compare this to は (ha) and を (wo), which are pronounced "wa" and "o" when used as grammatical particles.

For the kana romanized sometimes as "e", see we (kana).

Variant forms
Scaled-down versions of the kana (ぇ, ェ) are used to express morae foreign to the Japanese language, such as ヴェ (ve). In several Okinawan writing systems, a small ぇ is also combined with the kana く(ku) and ふ (fu or hu) to form the digraphs くぇ kwe and ふぇ hwe.

Transliteration
In the Hepburn, Kunrei-shiki and Nihon-shiki systems of romanization, both え and エ are transliterated as "e". In the Polivanov system of cyrillization, the kana are transliterated as "э".

Stroke order

The hiragana え is made with two strokes:
At the top, a short diagonal stroke proceeding downward and to the right.
At the bottom, a stroke composed of a horizontal line, a diagonal proceeding downward and to the left, and a rightward stroke resembling a tilde (~). 

The katakana エ is made with three strokes:
 At the top, a horizontal stroke from left to right.
 A downward vertical stroke starting in the center of the first stroke.
 At the bottom, a horizontal stroke parallel to the first stroke, and touching the second. This stroke is usually slightly longer than the first.
This is also the way to make the Latin letter "I" (although the correct upper case form does not look like the lower case Latin letter "l")

Other communicative representations

 Full Braille representation

 Computer encodings

 Archaic and Hentaigana

References

Specific kana